Balapareekshanam is a 1978 Indian Malayalam film, directed by Anthikkad Mani and produced by Babu Jose. The film stars Raghavan, Jayabharathi, KP Ummer, Adoor Bhasi and Babu Jose. Balapareekshanam's musical score is by M. K. Arjunan. The film was based on the Tamil film Poova Thalaiya.

Cast

Jayabharathi as Nirmala
Raghavan as Sankarankutty
K. P. Ummer as Govindankutty
Sukumari as Parvathyamma
Adoor Bhasi as Ramesh
Babu Jose
Kottayam Santha as Raji's mother
Pattom Sadan as Krishna Pilla
Shubha as Raji
Sreemoolanagaram Vijayan as Avarachan
Paul Vengola as Kochu Kunju
Pala Thankam as Krishna Pilla's wife
Radhadevi as Gouri

Soundtrack
The music was composed by M. K. Arjunan and the lyrics were written by Mankombu Gopalakrishnan.

References

External links
 

1978 films
1970s Malayalam-language films
Malayalam remakes of Tamil films
Films with screenplays by K. Balachander
Films with screenplays by Thoppil Bhasi